"Wicked Games" is the debut single by Canadian singer the Weeknd. It was recorded at Site Sound Studios and mixed at Liberty Studios in Toronto. Producers Doc McKinney and Illangelo co-wrote the song and performed all instrumentation. Originally recorded for The Weeknd's 2011 mixtape House of Balloons, the song was remastered and released as the lead single for his 2012 compilation album Trilogy. It was released as a digital single on October 22, 2012, by XO and Republic Records. Upon release, the single received widespread acclaim from music critics. On May 9, 2013, "Wicked Games" was certified double platinum by the Recording Industry Association of America (RIAA), for shipments of 2,000,000 units in the United States. The song was featured on the soundtrack for the movie Southpaw, the soundtrack's executive producer being American rapper Eminem who went on to produce a remix with The Weeknd on his later song "The Hills".

Music video
The music video for "Wicked Games" premiered on October 18, 2012, on the Weeknd's YouTube account on Vevo. The video starts off with pornographic actress Sunny Leone dancing in a coat with no clothes underneath, before the camera pans to the singer, who is shown singing expressively. Since its release, the music video has received over 200 million views on YouTube.

Personnel
Credits adapted from liner notes for Trilogy.

 The Weeknd – composer, primary artist
 Doc McKinney – composer, instrumentation, producer
 Illangelo – composer, instrumentation, mixing, producer
 Rainer Millar Blanchaer – composer

Charts

Weekly charts

Year-end charts

Certifications

Release history

In other media
An orchestral cover version of the song was used in Westworld season 3 episode "The Mother of Exiles" arranged and composed by Ramin Djawadi.

References

External links
 

2011 songs
2012 debut singles
The Weeknd songs
Songs written by the Weeknd
Songs written by Illangelo
Songs written by Doc McKinney
Song recordings produced by Illangelo
Republic Records singles
XO (record label) singles
Black-and-white music videos
Songs about drugs
Quiet storm songs